The 2021 Kazakhstan Cup is the 29th season of the Kazakhstan Cup, the annual nationwide football cup competition of Kazakhstan since the independence of the country. FC Kaisar are defending champions having beaten FC Atyrau in the final on 6 October 2019 to win their second Kazakhstan Cup, with the 2020 edition of the cup being cancelled due to the COVID-19 pandemic in Kazakhstan.

Participating clubs 
The following 28 teams qualified for the competition:

First round

Second round

Third round

Group stages

Group A

Group B

Group C

Group D

Quarterfinals

Semifinals
The four winners from the quarterfinals were drawn into two two-legged ties.

Final

Goal scorers

11 goals:

  Aydos Tattybayev - Shakhter Karagandy

6 goals:

  Artur Shushenachev - Kairat

5 goals:

  Elmar Nabiev - SDYuShOR 8
  Vágner Love - Kairat 

4 goals:

  José Kanté - Kairat
  Rade Dugalić - Kairat
  Zoran Tošić - Tobol
  Igor Sergeyev - Tobol

3 goals:

  Yevgeni Kozlov - Akzhayik
  Amal Seitov - Kyran
  Semir Smajlagić - Kyzylzhar
  Rashid Liuhai - Makhtaaral
  Edïge Oralbai - Makhtaaral
  Erbolat Rustemov - Makhtaaral
  Sultanbek Astanov - Ordabasy
  Martin Toshev - Shakhter Karagandy
  Oralkhan Omirtayev - Shakhter Karagandy
  David Atanaskoski - Shakhter Karagandy
  Idris Umayev - Shakhter Karagandy
  Uroš Nenadović - Taraz
  Stanley - Turan

2 goals:

  Miras Turlybek - Aksu
  Tigran Barseghyan - Astana
  Marin Tomasov - Astana
  Abat Aymbetov - Astana
  Gian - Atyrau
  Ramazan Karimov - Caspiy
  Ruslan Mingazow - Caspiy
  Matvey Matvienko - Ekibastuz
  Andrey Ulshin - Kairat
  Baglan Boribay - Kyran
  Danabek Kuanyshbay - Kyran
  Almas Izmailov - Kyzylzhar
  Darko Zorić - Kyzylzhar
  Yuriy Bushman - Kyzylzhar
  Dramane Koné - Makhtaaral
  Arman Tolegenov - Makhtaaral/SDYuShOR 8
  Ablaykhan Makhambetov - Okzhetpes
  Sergey Khizhnichenko - Ordabasy
  Artur Dadakhanov - SDYuShOR 8
  Karim Smykov - SDYuShOR 8
  Zhan-Ali Payruz - Shakhter Karagandy
  Bauyrzhan Baytana - Taraz
  Askhat Tagybergen - Tobol

1 goals:

  Nurbol Anuarbekov - Aksu
  Batyr Kudaiberdinov - Aksu
  Aikhan Yerzhanov - Aksu
  Michal Jeřábek - Aktobe
  Yury Logvinenko - Aktobe
  Maksim Samorodov - Aktobe
  Temirlan Yerlanov - Aktobe
  Oleg Chernyshov - Aktobe
  Luka Imnadze - Akzhayik
  Ivan Antipov - Akzhayik
  Mikhail Gashchenkov - Akzhayik
  Mykola Kovtalyuk - Akzhayik
  Max Ebong - Astana
  Islambek Kuat - Astana
  Žarko Tomašević - Astana
  Allef - Atyrau
  Piotr Grzelczak - Atyrau
  Dmitry Guz - Atyrau
  Aleksey Zaleski - Caspiy
  Chafik Tigroudja - Caspiy
  Aslan Darabayev - Caspiy
  Bekzat Kabylan - Caspiy
  Talgat Kusyapov - Caspiy
  Maksat Taykenov - Caspiy
  Ruslan Zhanysbaev - Caspiy
  Nikola Cuckić - Caspiy
  Wajdi Sahli - Caspiy
  Sayat Zhumagali - Ekibastuz
  Zhazylbek Abdibaitov - Igilik
  Diaz Sabyrov - Igilik
  Ihtiyar Abdurahmanov - Jenis
  Aybol Abiken - Kairat
  Gulzhigit Alykulov - Kairat
  Ricardo Alves - Kairat
  Clarence Bitang - Kaisar
  Elzhas Altynbekov - Kaisar
  Arman Kenesov - Kaisar
  Karolis Laukžemis - Kaisar
  Stefan Denković - Kaisar
  Yegor Potapov - Kaisar
  Serikzhan Abzhal - Kyran
  Bekzat Zhaksybayuly - Kyran
  Zhanserik Kaldybay - Kyran
  Artem Cheredinov - Kyzylzhar
  Alibek Kasym - Kyzylzhar
  Timur Muldinov - Kyzylzhar
  Saken Onlasyn - Kyzylzhar
  Dmitry Shmidt - Kyzylzhar
  Maksim Skorykh - Kyzylzhar
  Dierjon Aripov - Makhtaaral
  Sultanbek Duiseshov - Makhtaaral
  Evgeniy Levin - Makhtaaral
  Vladimir Sedelnikov - Makhtaaral
  Iskandar Kholmurzaev - Makhtaaral
  Ruslan Bolov - Okzhetpes
  Zhasulan Moldakaraev - Okzhetpes
  Kanat Ashirbay - Ordabasy
  Asludin Hadzhiev - Ordabasy
  Batyrkhan Tazhibay - Ordabasy
  Sagadat Tursynbay - Ordabasy
  Maksim Vaganov - Ordabasy
  Erik Zharylkasyn - Ordabasy
  Abdoulaye Diakate - Ordabasy
  Aleksandar Simčević - Ordabasy
  Samat Bortai - Ontustik Academy
  Salauat Gabdulakhmet - Ruzayevka
  Mergazy Narbi - SDYuShOR 8
  Artem Sherstov - SDYuShOR 8
  Altynbek Tuleev - SDYuShOR 8
  Pavel Nazarenko - Shakhter Karagandy
  Yevgeniy Shikavka - Shakhter Karagandy
  David Mawutor - Shakhter Karagandy
  Mikhail Gabyshev - Shakhter Karagandy
  Abylaikhan Nazimkhanov - Shakhter Karagandy
  Ruslan Tutkyshev - Shakhter Karagandy
  Berik Aitbayev - Taraz
  Dinmukhamed Karaman - Taraz
  Alisher Suley - Taraz
  Jérémy Manzorro - Tobol
  Toni Silva - Tobol
  Sultan Abilgazy - Tobol
  Roman Asrankulov - Tobol
  Serikzhan Muzhikov - Tobol
  Zhaslan Zhumashev - Tobol
  Dinmukhammed Omarov - Turan
  Mardan Tolebek - Turan
  Kuandyk Ilimov - Yassy-Turkestan
  Zhenis Abuov - Yassy-Turkestan
  Artjom Dmitrijev - Zhetysu
  Aslan Adil - Zhetysu
  Aleksey Mikhaylov - Zhetysu

Own goal

References

External links 
 

2021
Cup
2021 domestic association football cups